Rosy is a feminine given name or nickname. It may also refer to:

 Rosy, Poland, a village in Lublin Voivodeship
 Rosy, Minnesota, United States, an unincorporated community
 Rosie (1965 film), an Indian Malayalam film (also transliterated as Rosy)
 Rosy (film), an upcoming American film
"Rosy", a song by Loona from Olivia Hye

See also
 Rosey (disambiguation)
 Rosie (disambiguation)